Rhododendron keleticum (独龙杜鹃) is a species of flowering plant in the family Ericaceae, native to southeast Xizang and northwest Yunnan, China, as well as Myanmar. The flowers are pale purplish red or green tinged with red.

This hardy shrub is possibly the most suitable for a rock garden.

References

 Notes Roy. Bot. Gard. Edinburgh'' 13(61): 50 50 1920.

keleticum
Taxa named by George Forrest (botanist)
Taxa named by Isaac Bayley Balfour